Feathers is a 1987 Australian drama film directed by John Ruane. It was screened out of competition at the 1987 Cannes Film Festival. Ruane says his work on this film got him the job of directing Dead Letter Office.

Cast
 James Laurie as James
 Neil Melville as Bert
 Rebecca Gilling as Fran
 Julie Forsyth as Olla
 John Flaus as Doug
 Simon Westaway as TV Race Car Announcer

References

External links

Feathers at Oz Movies

1987 films
Australian drama films
1987 drama films
Australian independent films
1987 independent films
1980s English-language films
1980s Australian films